During the 2005–06 English football season, Nottingham Forest F.C. competed in the Football League One where they finished in 7th position on 69 points. It was a disappointing season for Forest who failed to make the play-offs by two points, with a failure to win any of their last three games costing them a play-off spot, though even 7th was something of an achievement considering they had been in the bottom half of the table when manager Gary Megson was dismissed on February after a bad run of form. In the three cup competitions they went in early rounds to Macclesfield, Chester and Woking .

Final league table

Results
Nottingham Forest's score comes first

Legend

Football League One

Results by matchday

League Cup

FA Cup

Football League Trophy

Squad

See also
2005–06 in English football

References

 Nottingham Forest 2005–06 at soccerbase.com (use drop down list to select relevant season)

Nottingham Forest F.C. seasons
Nott